Tayshaneta is a genus of North American leptonetids that was first described by J. Ledford in 2011.

Species
 it contains nineteen species, all found in the United States:
Tayshaneta anopica (Gertsch, 1974) – USA
Tayshaneta archambaulti Ledford, Paquin, Cokendolpher, Campbell & Griswold, 2012 – USA
Tayshaneta bullis (Cokendolpher, 2004) – USA
Tayshaneta coeca (Chamberlin & Ivie, 1942) (type) – USA
Tayshaneta concinna (Gertsch, 1974) – USA
Tayshaneta devia (Gertsch, 1974) – USA
Tayshaneta emeraldae Ledford, Paquin, Cokendolpher, Campbell & Griswold, 2012 – USA
Tayshaneta fawcetti Ledford, Paquin, Cokendolpher, Campbell & Griswold, 2012 – USA
Tayshaneta grubbsi Ledford, Paquin, Cokendolpher, Campbell & Griswold, 2012 – USA
Tayshaneta madla Ledford, Paquin, Cokendolpher, Campbell & Griswold, 2012 – USA
Tayshaneta microps (Gertsch, 1974) – USA
Tayshaneta myopica (Gertsch, 1974) – USA
Tayshaneta oconnorae Ledford, Paquin, Cokendolpher, Campbell & Griswold, 2012 – USA
Tayshaneta paraconcinna (Cokendolpher & Reddell, 2001) – USA
Tayshaneta sandersi Ledford, Paquin, Cokendolpher, Campbell & Griswold, 2012 – USA
Tayshaneta sprousei Ledford, Paquin, Cokendolpher, Campbell & Griswold, 2012 – USA
Tayshaneta valverdae (Gertsch, 1974) – USA
Tayshaneta vidrio Ledford, Paquin, Cokendolpher, Campbell & Griswold, 2012 – USA
Tayshaneta whitei Ledford, Paquin, Cokendolpher, Campbell & Griswold, 2012 – USA

See also
 List of Leptonetidae species

References

Araneomorphae genera
Leptonetidae
Spiders of the United States